Glenoe or Gleno is a hamlet in County Antrim, Northern Ireland. It is halfway between Larne and Carrickfergus. In the 2001 Census, it had a population of 87 people. Glenoe is in the Mid and East Antrim Borough Council area.

Places of interest

Glenoe Waterfall, owned by the National Trust, is located near the village. A church, St. Columbas Church of Ireland, is located at the top of the village, nearby the Orange Hall and Young Farmer's Hall. The village is home to an Orange Lodge and a Royal Black Preceptory. 

The Mauds Ice Cream factory was in Gleno, near the waterfall, between 1990 and 2000. It closed when the company moved to bigger premises in Carrickfergus.

Notable people
Martha Craig, 1866-1950; writer, lecturer and explorer, was born at Carneal and educated at Gleno National School. She explored Labrador in Canada and spent several summers with Native American tribes, being awarded the honorary title of Princess and the name Enookwashwooshoh, meaning 'Brave Woman'. She was educated at the Sorbonne in Paris and was the first woman to deliver a lecture at the University of Salamanca in Spain. 
Roy Beggs, politician, Member of the Legislative Assembly.
Gareth McAuley, Footballer, Linfield, Coleraine, Lincoln, Leicester, Ipswich, Rangers and Northern Ireland

References

External links
NI Neighbourhood Information System
Main Street - Glenoe

Villages in County Antrim